Ion Bucsa (born 28 February 1968) is a Moldovan biathlete. He competed at the 1998 Winter Olympics and the 2002 Winter Olympics.

References

1968 births
Living people
Moldovan male biathletes
Moldovan male cross-country skiers
Olympic biathletes of Moldova
Olympic cross-country skiers of Moldova
Biathletes at the 1998 Winter Olympics
Cross-country skiers at the 2002 Winter Olympics
People from Hîncești District